Nicolas Mahut was the defending champion and 2nd seed. He reached the final, but lost to 1st seed Grigor Dimitrov 2–6, 6–7(4–7).

Seeds

Draw

Finals

Top half

Bottom half

References
 Main Draw
 Qualifying Draw

Challenger DCNS de Cherbourg - Singles
2011 Singles